Rozewie may refer to:
Cape Rozewie in northern Poland
Rozewie, Pomeranian Voivodeship, a village in northern Poland